Prasophyllum beatrix, commonly known as the Marung leek orchid, is a species of orchid endemic to eastern Australia. It has a single tubular leaf and up to thirty five scented flowers with yellowish-green or purplish markings and is mainly confined to New South Wales.

Description
As with others in the genus, the flowers are inverted so that the labellum is above the column rather than below it. The lateral sepals are a similar size to the dorsal sepal and are usually free each other. Flowering occurs from September to October.

Taxonomy and naming
Prasophyllum beatrix was first formally described in 2006 by David Jones and Dean Rouse from a specimen collected from the Buckingbong State Forest near Narrandera and the description was published in Australian Orchid Research. The specific epithet (beatrix) is a Latin word beatusmeaning "she that makes happy", referring to "the pleasant feelings engendered when finding this species in its natural habitat'.

Distribution and habitat
This leek orchid grows in grassy woodland in New South Wales but there is a single record from the Terrick Terrick National Park in Victoria.

References

External links 
 

beatrix
Flora of New South Wales
Flora of Victoria (Australia)
Plants described in 2006
Endemic orchids of Australia